No. 532 Squadron RAF was one of the ten Turbinlite nightfighter squadrons of the Royal Air Force during the Second World War.

History
No. 532 Squadron RAF was formed on 2 September 1942 from 1453 (Turbinlite) Flight, based at RAF Wittering. 1453 Turbinlite Flight had previously operated in conjunction with No. 151 Squadron RAF and No. 486 Squadron RNZAF. It was disbanded at RAF Hibaldstow on 25 January 1943, when the Turbinlite squadrons were, due to lack of success on their part and the rapid development of AI radar, thought to be superfluous.

Aircraft operated

Squadron bases

Commanding officers

References

Notes

Bibliography

External links
  (old site)
  (new site)
 
 

532 Squadron
Military units and formations established in 1942